Varndean School is a secondary school serving a large area of Brighton, England.

In 2013, 2017 and 2022, Ofsted inspectors described Varndean as a 'Good' school. Varndean shares the Surrenden Campus with Balfour Primary School, Dorothy Stringer School, Varndean College and Downs View Link college.

History
Varndean was founded in 1884 in central Brighton as York Place Higher Grade School. An Organised Science School was added in 1894. The name changed to Brighton Municipal Secondary School for Girls in 1905. During World War I, the York Place buildings were taken over for use as an Indian Military Hospital and not returned until 1919.

In 1926, the school moved to a new site on the outskirts of Brighton. It was renamed 'Varndean' School for Girls, after the nearby farm. The new building was opened by the Duchess of Atholl. In 1929, a football club, Old Varndeanians, was established for former pupils.

During World War II half the school evacuated to Yorkshire.

The School was a Grammar school for girls until the comprehensive movement and the take-over of Brighton by East Sussex County Council saw the educational system reorganised. Between 1975 and 1979, Varndean Grammar School for Girls became Varndean High School, a coeducational comprehensive. The Boys' Grammar School became Varndean Sixth Form College.

The school’s position on Ditchling Road provides far reaching views across Brighton and Hove, and equally the school is visible from much of the City. The original building design from 1926 has been both modified and expanded since to accommodate increased pupil numbers. In the original building, several rooms have been converted into IT suites and extensions made to house new Mathematics rooms, a Music suite and extra PE facilities, such as a Fitness Suite and a Dance Studio. A Sports hall and an astro-turf pitch have also been added.

The Balfour Building, opened in 1993, houses Art and Design Technology. The Friar Building, in use since 2000, accommodates English and Humanities. In 2008, a new expanded Library opened in the Ditchling building, which was refurbished in 2013 as the new Reading Room. Further expansion works within the existing building footprint are due to proceed in 2021.

Varndean was the first specialist school in the city, being granted a specialism in Technology in 1998. In 2005 it went on to be designated a high-performing specialist school; in 2006 Varndean obtained its second specialism in Music, followed by a third specialism in Applied Learning in 2007.

Several Pygmy goats were introduced in September 2016 and were cared for by students. The goats were initially being rehomed and intended to control grass, but their therapeutic effects and recreational benefits were recognised. In April 2021, the goats were moved to Ferring Country Centre during construction works at the school, but are now there permanently.

Headteachers
Below is a list of all the headteachers of the school.
1884–1894 M. Brion
1894–1901 A. North
1901–1909 L. Hilton
1909–1937 E. Ellis
1937–1961 M. Warmington (Varndean School for Girls)
1961–1977 R. Clarke (Varndean School for Girls)
1977–1986 M. Smithers
1986–1999 P. Bowmaker O.B.E
1999–2008 A. Schofield
2009–2021 W. Deighan
2021– S. Baker

Notable current staff
Stuart Tuck, Professional footballer and coach (Brighton & Hove Albion, Eastbourne Borough, Bognor Regis Town, Whitehawk, Burgess Hill Town).

Notable former pupils

 Ebenezer Ford, FRSE, marine biologist
Russell Martin, football manager (Swansea City, MK Dons) and international footballer (Scotland, Rangers, Norwich City, Peterborough United, Wycombe Wanderers)
Lewis Dunk, international footballer (England, Brighton & Hove Albion)
Darren Freeman, professional footballer and manager (Brighton & Hove Albion, Fulham, Gillingham, Brentford, Whitehawk, Peacehaven & Telscombe, Lewes)
Tommy Fraser, professional footballer (Brighton & Hove Albion, Port Vale, Barnet, Whitehawk, Ebbsfleet United, Peacehaven & Telscombe, Lewes, Burgess Hill Town, Bognor Regis Town)
Alfie Deyes, television presenter (PointlessBlog, NME Awards, William Hill Casino TV).
Steve Gill, professional footballer (West Ham United, Hastings United, Bognor Regis Town, Worthing, Whitehawk)
Allan Gunn, international football referee
Helena Normanton, the first woman to join an institution of the legal profession, second woman to be called to the Bar of England and Wales, first British married woman to have a passport in the name she was born with. Pupil when school called York Place Higher Grade School.
Amita Suman, actress (Shadow and Bone, Doctor Who, Casualty, Ackley Bridge)

References

External links

Secondary schools in Brighton and Hove
Educational institutions established in 1884
1884 establishments in England
Community schools in Brighton and Hove